"Angel Tears" is a song by Scottish singer-songwriter Barrie-James O'Neill taken from his debut studio album, Cold Coffee (2016). It serves as the official first single from the record on 11 March 2016.

Music video
A lyric video for the song was released on 11 March 2016 by Joe Rubalcaba.

Track listing

References

2016 songs
Barrie-James O'Neill songs